This is a Bibliography of World War military units and formations. It aims to include historical sources and literature (and to avoid works of fiction) about specific unit formations of World War II, such as fronts/army groups, field armies, army corps, divisions, brigades, regiments, battalions, and companies. It also includes air force formations, such as air divisions, air groups, air wings, air squadrons and air force flights. Furthermore, it includes naval formations, such as naval divisions, naval squadrons, flotillas, carrier battle groups, naval task forces and naval fleets.

This article forms a part of the larger Bibliography of World War II. Bibliographies of individual warships and warship classes are omitted; they are listed separately in the Bibliography of World War II warships.

Bibliography

Army groups 
Includes OF-10 (field marshal) formations.

Germany 

Army Group A
 

Army Group Don
 

Army Group Center
 
 
 
 
 
 
 

Army Group Courland
 

Army Group North
 
 
 
 

Army Group South

United Kingdom 
21st Army Group

Field armies 
Includes OF-9 (four-star general) formations.

Germany

Army corps 
Includes OF-8 (three-star general) formations.

Germany 

  — XXXXVI Panzer Corps
  — Afrika Korps
  — Afrika Korps

United Kingdom 

  — Royal Army Veterinary Corps
  — Royal Army Medical Corps
  — Royal Military Police
  — Royal Army Ordnance Corps
  — Royal Electrical and Mechanical Engineers
  — Royal Armoured Corps
  — Royal Armoured Corps
  — Royal Corps of Signals
  — Royal Pioneer Corps
  — Royal Pioneer Corps
  — Reconnaissance Corps

United States 

  — XII Corps (Artillery)

Divisions 
Includes OF-7 (two-star general) formations.

Germany 

  — 1st Marine Division
  — 21st Panzer Division
  — 6th Infantry Division
  — 12th Infantry Division
  — 3rd Mountain Division
  — 329th Infantry Division
  — 96th Infantry Division
  — 62nd Infantry Division
  — 6th Panzer Division
  — 6th Mountain Division

United Kingdom 

  — 79th Armoured Division
  — 53rd (Welsh) Infantry Division
  — 52nd (Lowland) Infantry Division
  — 51st (Highland) Division
  — 1st Airborne Division
  — 50th (Northumbrian) Infantry Division
  — 79th Armoured Division
  — 43rd (Wessex) Infantry Division
  — 59th (Staffordshire) Infantry Division
  — 15th (Scottish) Infantry Division
  — 1st Airborne Division
  — 78th Infantry Division
  — Guards Armoured Division
  — 51st (Highland) Division
  — 1st Airborne Division
  — 7th Armoured Division
  — Guards Armoured Division
  — 4th Infantry Division

United States 

  — 29th Infantry Division
  — 14th Armored Division
  — 82nd Airborne Division
  — 82nd Airborne Division
  — 84th Infantry Division
  — 11th Airborne Division
  — 1st Armored Division
  — 4th Armored Division
  — 8th Armored Division
  — 10th Armored Division
  — 17th Airborne Division
  — 101st Airborne Division
  — 3rd Armored Division
  — 13th Armored Division

Brigades 
Includes OF-6 (one-star general) formations. In the air force, this level applies to RAF groups and to U.S. air wings.

Australia 

  — 24th Brigade

Poland (in exile) 

  — 1st Polish Independent Parachute Brigade

United Kingdom 

  — 6th Guards Tank Brigade
  — No. 5 Group RAF

Regiments 
Includes OF-5 formations. In the armies, those are usually called "regiments". In the air forces, this level applies to RAF air wings and to U.S. air groups, as well as to Canadian air wings, French escadres, German Geschwader, Italian Stormo, etc.

Australia 

  — 2/3rd Anti-Tank Regiment
  — 2/2nd Field Regiment
  — 2/7th Field Regiment
  — 2/7th Cavalry Commando Regiment (formerly: 7th Australian Division Cavalry Regiment)
  — 2/1st Field Regiment
  — 2/4th Field Regiment
  — 2/9th Cavalry Commando Regiment (formerly: 9th Australian Division Cavalry Regiment)
  — 2/5th Field Regiment

Canada 

  — Algonquin Regiment
  — Governor General's Horse Guards
  — Lord Strathcona's Horse (Royal Canadians)
  — Hastings and Prince Edward Regiment
  — 5th Light Anti-Aircraft Regiment
  — 7th Reconnaissance / 17th Canadian Hussars
  — Queen's Own Cameron Highlanders
  — 15th Canadian Field Artillery Regiment

Germany

United Kingdom 

  — 7th Medium Regiment Royal Artillery (today: 32nd Regiment)
  — 44th Royal Tank Regiment
  — Cameronians (Scottish Rifles)
  — Royal Northumberland Fusiliers
  — London Scottish regiment
  — Duke of Wellington's Regiment
  — 3rd Queen Alexandra's Own Gurkha Rifles
  — Sherwood Foresters (Nottinghamshire and Derbyshire Regiment)
  — 16th/5th The Queen's Royal Lancers
  — 54th Light Anti-Aircraft Regiment (formerly 9th Battalion, Argyll and Sutherland Highlanders)
  — 2nd Dragoon Guards (Queen's Bays)
  — Manchester Regiment
  — Worcestershire Regiment
  — Royal Berkshire Regiment
  — 154th (Leicestershire Yeomanry) Field Regiment
  — Northern Rhodesia Regiment
  — Northumberland Hussars
  — 9th Queen's Royal Lancers
  — 149th Royal Artillery Field Regiment
  — Royal Norfolk Regiment
  — Royal Scots Greys
  — Queen's Own Royal West Kent Regiment
  — 11th Hussars
  — Queen's Own Royal West Kent Regiment
  — 110th Royal Artillery Field Regiment
  — Royal Warwickshire Regiment
  — Royal Hampshire Regiment
  — East Surrey Regiment
  — 7th Queen's Own Hussars
  — Loyal Regiment
  — Welch Regiment
  — London Rifle Brigade
  — East Lancashire Regiment
  — 17th Light Anti-Aircraft Regiment
  — King's Own Yorkshire Light Infantry
  — Welsh Guards
  — Scots Guards
  — Black Watch
  — 17th/21st Lancers
  — Irish Guards
  — 8th King's Royal Irish Hussars
  — 91st Anti-Tank Regiment (formerly 5th Battalion, Argyll and Sutherland Highlanders)
  — Grenadier Guards
  — Queen's Royal Regiment
  — Royal Inniskilling Fusiliers
  — Royal Lincolnshire Regiment (10th Regiment of Foot)
  — 3rd/4th County of London Yeomanry (Sharpshooters)
  — Grenadier Guards
  — Duke of Cornwall's Light Infantry
  — King's Own Scottish Borderers
  — Queen's Own Worcestershire Hussars
  — Rifle Brigade (The Prince Consort's Own)
  — GHQ Liaison Regiment
  — King's Own Yorkshire Light Infantry
  — Coldstream Guards
  — Northamptonshire Regiment
  — Honourable Artillery Company
  — Derbyshire Yeomanry
  — 144th Regiment Royal Armoured Corps
  — Royal Scots Fusiliers
  — Staffordshire Yeomanry (Queen's Own Royal Regiment) 
  — Royal Norfolk Regiment 
  — Royal Welch Fusiliers 
  — 15th Scottish Reconnaissance Regiment 
  — Kensington Regiment (Princess Louise's) 
  — 191st Field Regiment (Hertfordshire and Essex Yeomanry)
  — Gordon Highlanders
  — Sherwood Rangers Yeomanry
  — Essex Regiment
  — King's Dragoon Guards
  — Gordon Highlanders
  — Royal Scots (Royal Regiment)
  — South Lancashire Regiment
  — Oxfordshire and Buckinghamshire Light Infantry
  — Suffolk Regiment
  — 2nd Household Cavalry Regiment
  — Royal Fusiliers (City of London Regiment)
  — 93rd Anti-Tank Regiment (formerly 6th Battalion, Argyll and Sutherland Highlanders)
  — Bedfordshire and Hertfordshire Regiment
  — Royal Gloucestershire Hussars
  — Royal Wiltshire Yeomanry
  — Royal Dragoons
  — 19th King George's Own Lancers
  — Queen's Own Cameron Highlanders
  — Durham Light Infantry
  — West Yorkshire Regiment
  — Parachute Regiment
  — 43rd (Wessex) Reconnaissance Regiment
  — Fife and Forfar Yeomanry
  — Border Regiment
  — York and Lancaster Regiment
  — 2nd King Edward VII's Own Gurkha Rifles (The Sirmoor Rifles)
  — Argyll and Sutherland Highlanders
  — Green Howards
  — Royal Leicestershire Regiment
  — King's Royal Rifle Corps
  — 1st Household Cavalry Regiment

United States 

  — 492nd Bomb Group
  — 508th Parachute Infantry Regiment
  — 305th Bomb Group
  — 13th Armored Regiment (Light)
  — 119th Field Artillery Group (later: 119th Regiment)
  — 67th Armored Regiment

Battalions 
Includes OF-4 formations, such as army battalions or air force squadrons (French air force: Escadron, German air force: Gruppe).

Australia 

  — 2/2nd Australian Pioneer Battalion
  — 2/10th Battalion
  — 42nd Battalion
  — 2/43rd Battalion
  — 2/27th Battalion
  — 29th/46th Battalion
  — 2/13th Battalion
  — No. 460 Squadron RAAF
  — 2/48th Battalion
  — No. 455 Squadron RAAF
  — 22nd Battalion
  — 2/2nd Battalion
  — 2/28th Battalion
  — 58th Battalion; 59th Battalion; 58th/59th Battalion
  — 2/30th Battalion
  — 2/14th Battalion
  — 2/22nd Battalion
  — 24th Battalion
  — 2/16th Battalion

United Kingdom 

  — 1st Battalion, Argyll and Sutherland Highlanders
  — 10th Battalion, Parachute Regiment
  — 1st Battalion, Dorsetshire Regiment
  — No. 617 Squadron RAF
  — 2/7th Battalion, Queen's Royal Regiment
  — 7th Battalion, Argyll and Sutherland Highlanders
  — 1st Battalion, Argyll and Sutherland Highlanders
  — 8th Battalion, Durham Light Infantry
  — 6th Battalion, Black Watch
  — 8th Battalion, Argyll and Sutherland Highlanders
  — 2nd Battalion, Argyll and Sutherland Highlanders
  — 4th Battalion, Wiltshire Regiment
  — 2nd Battalion, Coldstream Guards; 3rd Battalion, Coldstream Guards
  — 4th Battalion, Dorsetshire Regiment
  — 2nd Battalion, Dorsetshire Regiment

United States 

  — 133rd Anti-Aircraft Artillery Battalion
  — 550th Airborne Infantry Battalion
  — 550th Airborne Infantry Battalion
  — 383rd Anti-Aircraft Artillery Battalion
  — 27th Troop Carrier Squadron
  — 489th Bombardment Squadron
  — 555th Anti-Aircraft Artillery Automatic Weapons Battalion
  — 862nd Anti-Aircraft Artillery Automatic Weapons Battalion
  — 195th Anti-Aircraft Artillery Battalion
  — 778th Anti-Aircraft Artillery Battalion
  — 194th Field Artillery Battalion
  — 243rd Field Artillery Battalion
  — 184th Anti-Aircraft Artillery Battalion
  — 345th Field Artillery Battalion
  — 457th Anti-Aircraft Artillery Battalion
  — 375th Field Artillery Battalion
  — 693rd Field Artillery Battalion
  — 387th Anti-Aircraft Artillery Battalion
  — 790th Field Artillery Battalion
  — 305th Field Artillery Battalion
  — 65th Armored Field Artillery Battalion
  — 536th Anti-Aircraft Battalion

Companies 
Includes OF-3 formations.

Australia 

  — 2/2nd Commando Squadron and 2/4th Commando Squadron

United Kingdom 

  — 42nd Field Company, Corps of Royal Engineers

United States 

  — B Company, 23rd Armored Infantry Battalion, 7th Armored Division

See also 

 Bibliography of World War II
 Bibliography of World War II battles and campaigns in East Asia, South East Asia and the Pacific
 Bibliography of World War II battles and campaigns in Europe, North Africa and the Middle East
Military units and formations